Alexandre Silveira de Oliveira (born 15 July 1970) is a former police chief, businessman and Brazilian politician, affiliated with the Social Democratic Party (PSD). He is currently a senator for Minas Gerais.

Political career 
In 2003, Alexandre Silveira was invited by the then vice president of Brazil, José Alencar, to occupy the position of general coordinator of the 6th Terrestrial Infrastructure Unit (Unit), a body linked to the National Department of Transport Infrastructure (DNIT). In 2004, he assumed the general directorate of DNIT, remaining in that position until December 2005.

He was a federal deputy in the Legislature from 2007 to 2011, elected by the Popular Socialist Party (PPS). He was re-elected federal deputy by the PSD for the 2011–2014 term. In January 2011, Alexandre Silveira took over the Extraordinary Secretariat for Metropolitan Management in Minas Gerais. He was also Secretary of State for Health in 2014.

Also in 2014, he was elected first substitute for former governor Antonio Anastasia. He became a senator in 2022, with the resignation of Anastasia to assume the post of minister of the Federal Court of Accounts (TCU).

References 

1970 births
Living people
People from Belo Horizonte
Social Democratic Party (Brazil, 2011) politicians
Members of the Chamber of Deputies (Brazil) from Minas Gerais
Members of the Federal Senate (Brazil)
Energy ministers of Brazil